Pierre Nougaro (27 April 1904 in Toulouse - 26 October 1988 in Marseille) was a French operatic baritone, the father of the singer Claude Nougaro.

Life 
He obtained a first prize for singing.

In Rennes, Nougaro increased audiences by expanding the repertoire, including operettas in the season, and a world premiere every year. He also brought in the famous opera stars.

In 1967, he retired from the Rennes theatre (later called the ).

From the 1970s and for many years to come, his dramatic talent opened the door to a new career in television and film. He appeared in many TV movies, and in films directed by Claude Chabrol and Claude Berri among others.

Filmography 
 1980: Médecins de nuit by Jean-Pierre Prévost, episode La pension Michel
 1981: Les Cinq Dernières Minutes by Claude Loursais, episode Mort au bout du monde
 1984: he plays the character of Édouard Vialhe (the patriarch) at the beginning of the peasant saga 
 1986: Jean de Florette
 1986: Manon des sources
 1987: Masks

References

External links 
 
 Pierre Nougaro Voilà donc la terrible cité ! (Massenet) YouTube

1904 births
1988 deaths
Musicians from Toulouse
French operatic baritones
Opera managers
20th-century French male actors
20th-century French male singers